Cephalostachyum viguieri is a plant in the grass family in the subfamily Bambusoideae (bamboo). It is native to Madagascar, where it was collected by René Viguier (1880–1931) for whom it was named.

References

Plants described in 1925
Endemic flora of Madagascar
Bambusoideae